Yesaya Nickhanor Desnam or Yesaya Desnam is an Indonesian footballer who currently plays for the Perseru Serui in the Indonesia Soccer Championship.
His natural position is defender. He is the first Asmat to play for Indonesia. He was in the squad for 2010 AFF Championship.

References

External links

1985 births
Living people
Indonesian Christians
Indonesian footballers
Indonesia international footballers
People from Merauke Regency
People from Wamena
Association football central defenders
Persiwa Wamena players
Liga 1 (Indonesia) players
Indonesian Premier Division players
Persebaya Surabaya players
Sportspeople from Papua